Joseph Frank "Buster" Keaton (October 4, 1895 – February 1, 1966) was an American actor, comedian, and filmmaker. He is best known for his silent film work, in which his trademark was physical comedy accompanied by a stoic, deadpan expression that earned him the nickname "The Great Stone Face". Critic Roger Ebert wrote of Keaton's "extraordinary period from 1920 to 1929" when he "worked without interruption" as having made him "the greatest actor-director in the history of the movies". In 1996, Entertainment Weekly recognized Keaton as the seventh-greatest film director, writing that "More than Chaplin, Keaton understood movies: He knew they consisted of a four-sided frame in which resided a malleable reality off which his persona could bounce. A vaudeville child star, Keaton grew up to be a tinkerer, an athlete, a visual mathematician; his films offer belly laughs of mind-boggling physical invention and a spacey determination that nears philosophical grandeur." In 1999, the American Film Institute ranked him as the 21st-greatest male star of classic Hollywood cinema.

Working with independent producer Joseph M. Schenck and filmmaker Edward F. Cline, Keaton made a series of successful two-reel comedies in the early 1920s, including One Week (1920), The Playhouse (1921), Cops (1922), and The Electric House (1922). He then moved to feature-length films; several of them, such as Sherlock Jr. (1924), The General (1926), Steamboat Bill, Jr. (1928), and The Cameraman (1928), remain highly regarded. The General is viewed as his masterpiece: Orson Welles considered it "the greatest comedy ever made...and perhaps the greatest film ever made". Welles said Keaton "was beyond all praise...a very great artist, and one of the most beautiful men I ever saw on the screen. He was also a great director. In the last analysis, no one came near him." In 2018, Peter Bogdanovich released The Great Buster: A Celebration, a tribute to Keaton featuring Mel Brooks, Carl Reiner, Werner Herzog and Quentin Tarantino, among others. Keaton's art has inspired full academic study. The General has placed highly on the Sight & Sound poll, and Our Hospitality, Sherlock Jr. and The Navigator also received multiple votes.

His career declined when he signed with Metro-Goldwyn-Mayer and lost his artistic independence. His wife divorced him, and he descended into alcoholism. He recovered in the 1940s, remarried, and revived his career as an honored comic performer for the rest of his life, earning an Academy Honorary Award in 1959. Late in his career, Keaton made cameos in Wilder's Sunset Boulevard, Chaplin's Limelight, Samuel Beckett's Film and the Twilight Zone episode "Once Upon a Time".

Keaton is often described as having been ahead of his time; Anthony Lane wrote "He was just too good, in too many ways, too soon... No action thriller of the last, blood-streaked decade has matched the kinetic violence at the end of Steamboat Bill, Jr., in which a storm pulls Keaton through one random catastrophe after another. Anyone who thinks that the movie-within-a-movie is a recent conceit, the province of The Purple Rose of Cairo and Last Action Hero, should check out Sherlock Jr., a film in which Keaton dreams himself into another film: he strolls up the aisle of the theatre, hops into the action, and fights to keep up with the breakneck changes of scene. As for The General, where do you start? It's a film about a train, but it's also a spirited romance, peppered with bickering and longing, and its evocation of the Civil War period has never been surpassed... He is the first action hero; to be precise, he is a small, pale-faced American who is startled, tripped, drenched and inspired into becoming a hero."

Career

Early life in vaudeville 

Keaton was born into a vaudeville family in Piqua, Kansas, the small town where his mother, Myra Keaton (née Cutler), was when she went into labor. He was named Joseph to continue a tradition on his father's side (he was sixth in a line bearing the name Joseph Keaton) and Frank for his maternal grandfather, who disapproved of his parents' union. His father was Joseph Hallie "Joe" Keaton who had a traveling show called the Mohawk Indian Medicine Company, which performed on stage and sold patent medicine on the side. According to a frequently repeated story, which may be apocryphal, Keaton acquired the nickname Buster at the age of 18 months. After the child fell down a long flight of stairs without injury, an actor friend named George Pardey remarked, "Gee whiz, he's a regular buster!" After this, Keaton's father began to use the nickname to refer to the youngster. Keaton retold the anecdote over the years, including in a 1964 interview with the CBC's Telescope. In Keaton's retelling, he was six months old when the incident occurred, and Harry Houdini gave him the nickname (though the family did not get to know Houdini until later).

At the age of three, Keaton began performing with his parents in The Three Keatons. He first appeared on stage in 1899 in Wilmington, Delaware. The act was mainly a comedy sketch. Myra played the saxophone to one side, while Joe and Keaton performed center stage. The young Keaton goaded his father by disobeying him, and the elder Keaton responded by throwing him against the scenery, into the orchestra pit, or even into the audience. A suitcase handle was sewn into Keaton's clothing to aid with the constant tossing. The act evolved as Keaton learned to take trick falls safely; he was rarely injured or bruised on stage. This knockabout style of comedy led to accusations of child abuse, and occasionally, arrest. However, Keaton was always able to show the authorities that he had no bruises or broken bones. He was eventually billed as "The Little Boy Who Can't Be Damaged", and the overall act as "The Roughest Act That Was Ever in the History of the Stage". Decades later, Keaton said that he was never hurt by his father and that the falls and physical comedy were a matter of proper technical execution. In 1914, he told the Detroit News: "The secret is in landing limp and breaking the fall with a foot or a hand. It's a knack. I started so young that landing right is second nature with me. Several times I'd have been killed if I hadn't been able to land like a cat. Imitators of our act don't last long, because they can't stand the treatment."

Keaton said he had so much fun that he sometimes began laughing as his father threw him across the stage. Noticing that this caused the audience to laugh less, he adopted his famous deadpan expression when performing.

The act ran up against laws banning child performers in vaudeville. According to one biographer, Keaton was made to go to school while performing in New York, but only attended for part of one day. Despite tangles with the law, Keaton was a rising star in the theater. He stated that he learned to read and write late, and was taught by his mother. By the time he was 21, his father's alcoholism threatened the reputation of the family act, so Keaton and his mother, Myra, left for New York, where Keaton's career quickly moved from vaudeville to film.

Keaton served in the American Expeditionary Forces in France with the United States Army's 40th Infantry Division during World War I. His unit remained intact and was not broken up to provide replacements, as happened to some other late-arriving divisions. During his time in uniform, he suffered an ear infection that permanently impaired his hearing.

Film

Silent film era 
Keaton spent the summers of 1908–1916 "at the 'Actor's Colony' in the Bluffton neighborhood of Muskegon, along with other famous vaudevillians."

In February 1917, he met Roscoe "Fatty" Arbuckle at the Talmadge Studios in New York City, where Arbuckle was under contract to Joseph M. Schenck. Joe Keaton disapproved of films, and Keaton also had reservations about the medium. During his first meeting with Arbuckle, he was asked to jump in and start acting. Keaton was such a natural in his first film, The Butcher Boy, he was hired on the spot. At the end of the day, he asked to borrow one of the cameras to get a feel for how it worked. He took the camera back to his hotel room where he dismantled and reassembled it by morning. Keaton later said that he was soon Arbuckle's second director and his entire gag department. He appeared in a total of 14 Arbuckle shorts, running into 1920. They were popular, and contrary to Keaton's later reputation as "The Great Stone Face", he often smiled and even laughed in them. Keaton and Arbuckle became close friends, and Keaton was one of few people, along with Charlie Chaplin, to defend Arbuckle's character during accusations that he was responsible for the death of actress Virginia Rappe. (Arbuckle was eventually acquitted, with an apology from the jury for the ordeal he underwent.)

In 1920, The Saphead was released, in which Keaton had his first starring role in a full-length feature. It was based on a successful play, The New Henrietta, which had already been filmed once, under the title The Lamb, with Douglas Fairbanks playing the lead. Fairbanks recommended Keaton to take the role for the remake five years later, since the film was to have a comic slant.

After Keaton's successful work with Arbuckle, Schenck gave him his own production unit, Buster Keaton Productions. He made a series of two-reel comedies, including One Week (1920), The Playhouse (1921), Cops (1922), and The Electric House (1922). Keaton then moved to full-length features.

Keaton's writers included Clyde Bruckman, Joseph Mitchell, and Jean Havez, but the most ingenious gags were generally conceived by Keaton himself. Comedy director Leo McCarey, recalling the freewheeling days of making slapstick comedies, said, "All of us tried to steal each other's gagmen. But we had no luck with Keaton because he thought up his best gags himself and we couldn't steal him!" The more adventurous ideas called for dangerous stunts, performed by Keaton at great physical risk. During the railroad water-tank scene in Sherlock Jr., Keaton broke his neck when a torrent of water fell on him from a water tower, but he did not realize it until years afterwards. A scene from Steamboat Bill, Jr. required Keaton to stand still on a particular spot. Then, the facade of a two-story building toppled forward on top of Keaton. Keaton's character emerged unscathed, due to a single open window. The stunt required precision, because the prop house weighed two tons, and the window only offered a few inches of clearance around Keaton's body. The sequence furnished one of the most memorable images of his career.

Aside from Steamboat Bill, Jr. (1928), Keaton's most enduring feature-length films include Our Hospitality (1923), The Navigator (1924), Sherlock Jr. (1924), Seven Chances (1925), The Cameraman (1928), and The General (1926). The General, set during the American Civil War, combined physical comedy with Keaton's love of trains, including an epic locomotive chase. Employing picturesque locations, the film's storyline reenacted an actual wartime incident. Though it would come to be regarded as Keaton's greatest achievement, the film received mixed reviews at the time. It was too dramatic for some filmgoers expecting a lightweight comedy, and reviewers questioned Keaton's judgment in making a comedic film about the Civil War, even while noting it had a "few laughs."

It was an expensive misfire (the climactic scene of a locomotive plummeting through a burning bridge was the most expensive single shot in silent-film history), and Keaton was never entrusted with total control over his films again. His distributor, United Artists, insisted on a production manager who monitored expenses and interfered with certain story elements. Keaton endured this treatment for two more feature films, and then exchanged his independent setup for employment at Hollywood's biggest studio, Metro-Goldwyn-Mayer (MGM). Keaton's loss of independence as a filmmaker coincided with the coming of sound films (although he was interested in making the transition) and mounting personal problems, and his career in the early sound era was hurt as a result.

New studio, new problems 

Keaton's last three features had been produced and released independently, under Keaton's control, and fell short of financial expectations at the box office. In 1928 film executive Nicholas Schenck arranged a deal with Metro-Goldwyn-Mayer for Keaton's services. Keaton had little to say about the details of the MGM contract; he would no longer have any financial responsibility for his films, and even his salary had been pre-negotiated, without his own input. Charlie Chaplin and Harold Lloyd advised him against making the move, cautioning that he would lose his independence. But, given Schenck's desire to keep things "in the family" and Keaton's having to admit that his independent pictures hadn't done well, Keaton agreed to sign with MGM. He would later cite this as the worst business decision of his life in his autobiography. 

Welcomed to the studio by Irving Thalberg, with whom he initially had a relationship of mutual admiration, Keaton realized too late that the studio system MGM represented would severely limit his creative input. The giant studio was run along strict factory lines, with everything planned and budgeted in advance. The first of MGM's Keaton films was The Cameraman (1928), and Keaton sensed trouble immediately when he saw the script. "It was as long as War and Peace," Keaton recalled. "I took out 40 useless characters and a couple of subplots. These guys didn't realize—they still don't realize—that the best comedies are simple. I said, 'I'd like to do something with a drunk and a fat lady and a kid. Get 'em for me.' At my studio they would have the characters I wanted in 10 minutes. But not MGM. You had to requisition a toothpick in triplicate. I just stood there, and everybody is hassling." MGM wanted only Keaton the star, Keaton the creator was considered a waste of time and money because "in the time it took him to develop a project, he could have appeared in two or three pictures set up by the studio's production staff."

When the studio began making talking films, Keaton was enthused about the new technology and wanted to make his next film, Spite Marriage, with sound. MGM refused, because the film was more valuable in silent form; it could be shown around the world in theaters that had not converted to sound. Also, soundstages were then at a premium, and MGM usually reserved them for dramatic productions. MGM also forced Keaton to use a stunt double during some of the more dangerous scenes, something he had never done in his heyday, as MGM wanted badly to protect its investment. "...stuntmen don't get you laughs," Keaton had said.

In the first Keaton pictures with sound, he and his fellow actors would shoot each scene three times: once in English, once in Spanish, and once in either French or German. The actors would phonetically memorize the foreign-language scripts a few lines at a time and shoot immediately after. This is discussed in the TCM documentary Buster Keaton: So Funny it Hurt, with Keaton complaining about having to shoot lousy films not just once, but three times.

Keaton kept trying to persuade his bosses to let him do things his way. Production head Irving Thalberg would not permit Keaton to create a script from scratch because the studio had already purchased a stage property, Parlor, Bedroom, and Bath, at the suggestion of Lawrence Weingarten, who was Thalberg's brother-in-law and Keaton's producer. However, Thalberg did allow Keaton to stage the gags, including long stretches of pantomime, and agreed to send a crew to Keaton's own mansion for exterior shots. The film version was released as "A Buster Keaton Production" in 1931.

The next project confirmed Keaton's fears about studio interference. He was handed a script titled Sidewalks of New York (1932), in which he played a millionaire becoming involved with a slum-neighborhood girl and a gang of rowdy kids. Keaton thought the premise was totally unsuitable, and was uncomfortable with his directors Jules White and Zion Myers, who emphasized blunt slapstick. "I went over (Weingarten's) head and appealed to Irving Thalberg to help get me out of the assignment. Irving was usually on my side, but this time he said, 'Larry likes it. Everybody else in the studio likes the story. You are the only one who doesn't.' In the end, I gave up like a fool and said 'what the hell?' Who was I to say I was right and everyone was wrong?" Keaton made the film anyway, and was amazed that it became his biggest box office success.

MGM had been featuring comical musician Cliff Edwards in Keaton's films. The studio replaced Edwards, who had substance-abuse problems, with nightclub comedian Jimmy Durante. The laconic Keaton and the rambunctious Durante offered enough contrast to function as a team, resulting in three very successful films: Speak Easily (1932), The Passionate Plumber (1932), and What! No Beer? (1933). The latter was Keaton's last starring feature in his home country. (Thirty years later, both Keaton and Durante had cameo roles in It's a Mad Mad Mad Mad World, albeit not in the same scenes.)

Keaton was so demoralized during the production of 1933's What! No Beer? that MGM fired him after the filming was completed, despite the film being a commercial hit. In another telling, Keaton was fired after MGM studio chief Louis B. Mayer "raided" Keaton's dressing room during a wild party with Keaton's "cronies and their girlfriends" and Keaton "angrily ordered Mayer to get out." Keaton then refused to appear at a publicity event, and was fired 48 hours later. In 1934, Keaton accepted an offer to make an independent film in Paris, Le Roi des Champs-Élysées. During this period, he made another film in England, The Invader (released in the United States as An Old Spanish Custom in 1936).

Educational Pictures 
Upon Keaton's return to Hollywood in 1934, he made a screen comeback in two-reel comedies for Educational Pictures. Most of these 16 films are simple visual comedies, with many of the gags supplied by Keaton himself, often recycling ideas from his family vaudeville act and his earlier films. Keaton had a free hand in staging the films, within the studio's budgetary limits and using its staff writers. The Educational two-reelers have far more pantomime than his earlier talkies, and Keaton is in good form throughout. The high point in the Educational series is Grand Slam Opera (1936), featuring Keaton in his own screenplay as an amateur-hour contestant.

Gag writer 
When the Educational series lapsed in 1937, Keaton returned to MGM as a gag writer, supplying material for the final three Marx Brothers MGM films: At the Circus (1939), Go West (1940), and The Big Store (1941); these were not as artistically successful as the Marxes' previous MGM features. Keaton also directed three one-reel novelty shorts for the studio, but these did not result in further directorial assignments.

Columbia Pictures 
In 1939, Columbia Pictures hired Keaton to star in 10 two-reel comedies; the series ran for two years, and comprise his last series as a starring comedian. The director was usually Jules White, whose emphasis on slapstick and farce made most of these films resemble White's famous Three Stooges shorts. Keaton's personal favorite was the series' debut, Pest from the West, a shorter, tighter remake of Keaton's little-viewed 1934 feature The Invader; it was directed not by White but by Del Lord, a veteran director for Mack Sennett. Moviegoers and exhibitors welcomed Keaton's Columbia comedies.

1940s and feature films 
Keaton's personal life had stabilized with his 1940 marriage to MGM dancer Eleanor Norris, and now he was taking life a little easier, abandoning Columbia for the less strenuous field of feature films. Resuming his daily job as an MGM gag writer, he provided material for Red Skelton and gave help and advice to Lucille Ball.

Keaton accepted various character roles in both "A" and "B" features. He made his last starring feature, El Moderno Barba Azul (1946), in Mexico; the film was a low-budget production, and it may not have been seen in the United States until its release on VHS in the 1980s, under the title Boom in the Moon. The film has a largely negative reputation, with renowned film historian Kevin Brownlow calling it the worst film ever made.

Critics rediscovered Keaton in 1949 and producers occasionally hired him for bigger "prestige" pictures. He had cameos in such films as In the Good Old Summertime (1949), Sunset Boulevard (1950), and Around the World in 80 Days (1956). In In the Good Old Summertime, Keaton personally directed the stars Judy Garland and Van Johnson in their first scene together, where they bump into each other on the street. Keaton invented comedy bits where Johnson keeps trying to apologize to a seething Garland, but winds up messing up her hairdo and tearing her dress.

Keaton also appeared in a comedy routine about two inept stage musicians in Charlie Chaplin's Limelight (released in 1952), recalling the vaudeville of The Playhouse. With the exception of Seeing Stars, a minor publicity film produced in 1922, Limelight was the only time in which the two would ever appear together on film.

Television and rediscovery 

In 1949, comedian Ed Wynn invited Keaton to appear on his CBS Television comedy-variety show, The Ed Wynn Show, which was televised live on the West Coast. Kinescopes were made for distribution of the programs to other parts of the country, since there was no transcontinental coaxial cable until September 1951. Reaction was strong enough for a local Los Angeles station to offer Keaton his own show, also broadcast live, in 1950.

Life with Buster Keaton (1951) was an attempt to recreate the first series on film, allowing the program to be broadcast nationwide. The series benefited from a company of veteran actors, including Marcia Mae Jones as the ingenue, Iris Adrian, Dick Wessel, Fuzzy Knight, Dub Taylor, Philip Van Zandt, and his silent-era contemporaries Harold Goodwin, Hank Mann, and stuntman Harvey Parry. Keaton's wife Eleanor also was seen in the series (notably as Juliet to Keaton's Romeo in a little-theater vignette). The theatrical feature film The Misadventures of Buster Keaton was fashioned from the series. Keaton said that he canceled the filmed series himself, because he was unable to create enough fresh material to produce a new show each week.

Keaton's periodic television appearances during the 1950s and 1960s helped to revive interest in his silent films. He appeared in the early television series Faye Emerson's Wonderful Town. Whenever a TV show wanted to simulate silent-movie comedy, Keaton answered the call and guested in such successful series as The Ken Murray Show, You Asked for It, and The Garry Moore Show, and The Ed Sullivan Show. Well into his fifties, Keaton successfully recreated his old routines, including one stunt in which he propped one foot onto a table, then swung the second foot up next to it and held the awkward position in midair for a moment before crashing to the stage floor. Garry Moore recalled, "I asked (Keaton) how he did all those falls, and he said, 'I'll show you.' He opened his jacket and he was all bruised. So that's how he did it—it hurt—but you had to care enough not to care."

Silent films revived 
In 1954, Keaton and Eleanor met film programmer Raymond Rohauer, with whom they developed a business partnership to re-release his films. Actor James Mason had bought the Keatons' house and found numerous cans of films, among which was Keaton's long-lost classic The Boat. Keaton had prints of the features Three Ages, Sherlock Jr., Steamboat Bill, Jr., and College (missing one reel), and the shorts "The Boat" and "My Wife's Relations", which Keaton and Rohauer then transferred to Cellulose acetate film from deteriorating nitrate film stock.

From 1950 through 1964, Keaton made around 70 guest appearances on television variety shows, including those of Ed Sullivan and Garry Moore. Keaton also found steady work as an actor in TV commercials for Colgate, Alka-Seltzer, U.S. Steel, 7-Up, RCA Victor, Phillips 66, Milky Way, Ford Motors, Minute Rub, and Budweiser, among others. In a series of silent television commercials for Simon Pure Beer made in 1962 by Jim Mohr in Buffalo, New York, Keaton revisited some of the gags from his silent film days.

On April 3, 1957, Keaton was surprised by Ralph Edwards for the weekly NBC program This Is Your Life. The program also promoted the release of the biographical film The Buster Keaton Story with Donald O'Connor. In December 1958, Keaton was a guest star in the episode "A Very Merry Christmas" of The Donna Reed Show on ABC. He returned to the program in 1965 in the episode "Now You See It, Now You Don't". In August 1960, Keaton played mute King Sextimus the Silent in the national touring company of the Broadway musical Once Upon A Mattress. In 1960, he returned to MGM for the final time, playing a lion tamer in a 1960 adaptation of Mark Twain's The Adventures of Huckleberry Finn. Much of the film was shot on location on the Sacramento River, which doubled for the Mississippi River setting of Twain's book. In 1961, he starred in The Twilight Zone episode "Once Upon a Time", which included both silent and sound sequences. He worked with comedian Ernie Kovacs on a television pilot tentatively titled "Medicine Man," shooting scenes for it on January 12, 1962—the day before Kovacs died in a car crash. "Medicine Man" was completed but not aired.

In 1961, Keaton appeared in promotional films for Maryvale, a housing development in the western part of Phoenix.

Meanwhile, Keaton's big-screen career continued. He had a cameo as Jimmy, appearing near the end of the film It's a Mad, Mad, Mad, Mad World (1963). Jimmy assists Spencer Tracy's character, Captain C. G. Culpepper, by readying Culpepper's ultimately-unused boat for his abortive escape. (The restored version of that film, released in 2013, contains a scene where Jimmy and Culpeper talk on the telephone. Lost after the comedy epic's "roadshow" exhibition, the audio of that scene was discovered and combined with still pictures to recreate the scene.)

Keaton starred in five films for American International Pictures: Pajama Party (1964), Beach Blanket Bingo, How to Stuff a Wild Bikini, and Sergeant Deadhead (all 1965), and War Italian Style (1966, co-starring the Italian comedy team of Franco and Ciccio). Director William Asher recalled:

In 1965, Keaton starred in the short film The Railrodder for the National Film Board of Canada. He traveled from one end of Canada to the other on a motorized handcar, wearing his traditional pork pie hat and performing gags similar to those in films that he made 50 years before. The film is also notable for being his last silent screen performance. He played the central role in Samuel Beckett's Film (1965), directed by Alan Schneider. 

In 1965 he appeared on the CBS television special A Salute to Stan Laurel, a tribute to the comedian and friend of Keaton who had died earlier that year.

Keaton's last commercial film appearance was in A Funny Thing Happened on the Way to the Forum (1966), which was filmed in Spain in September–November 1965. He amazed the cast and crew by doing many of his own stunts, although the Thames Television documentary reported that his increasingly ill health did force the use of a stunt double for some scenes. His final appearance on film was in The Scribe, a 1966 safety film produced in Toronto by the Construction Safety Associations of Ontario: he died shortly after completing it.

Style and themes

Use of parody 

Keaton started experimenting with parody during his vaudeville years, where most frequently his performances involved impressions and burlesques of other performers' acts. Most of these parodies targeted acts with which Keaton had shared the bill. When Keaton transposed his experience in vaudeville to film, in many works he parodied melodramas. Other favorite targets were cinematic plots, structures and devices.

One of his most biting parodies is The Frozen North (1922), a satirical take on William S. Hart's Western melodramas, like Hell's Hinges (1916) and The Narrow Trail (1917). Keaton parodied the tired formula of the melodramatic transformation from bad guy to good guy, which Hart's characters went through, known as "the good badman". He wears a small version of Hart's campaign hat from the Spanish–American War and a six-shooter on each thigh, and during the scene in which he shoots the neighbor and her husband, he reacts with thick glycerin tears, a trademark of Hart's. Audiences of the 1920s recognized the parody and thought the film hysterically funny. However, Hart himself was not amused by Keaton's antics, particularly the crying scene, and did not speak to Keaton for two years after he had seen the film. The film's opening intertitles give it its mock-serious tone, and are taken from "The Shooting of Dan McGrew" by Robert W. Service.

In The Playhouse (1921), he parodied his contemporary Thomas H. Ince, Hart's producer, who indulged in over-crediting himself in his film productions. The short also featured the impression of a performing monkey which was likely derived from a co-biller's act (called Peter the Great). Three Ages (1923), his first feature-length film, is a parody of D. W. Griffith's Intolerance (1916), from which it replicates the three inter-cut shorts structure. Three Ages also featured parodies of Bible stories, like those of Samson and Daniel. Keaton directed the film, along with Edward F. Cline. By this time, Keaton had further developed his distinct signature style that consisted of lucidity and precision along with acrobatics of ballistic precision and kineticism. Critic and film historian Imogen Sara Smith stated about Keaton's style:

the coolness and subtlety of his style [is] very cinematic in terms of recognising that the camera can pick up very, very small effects

Body language 

Film critic David Thomson later described Keaton's style of comedy: "Buster plainly is a man inclined towards a belief in nothing but mathematics and absurdity ... like a number that has always been searching for the right equation. Look at his face—as beautiful but as inhuman as a butterfly—and you see that utter failure to identify sentiment." Gilberto Perez commented on "Keaton's genius as an actor to keep a face so nearly deadpan and yet render it, by subtle inflections, so vividly expressive of inner life. His large, deep eyes are the most eloquent feature; with merely a stare, he can convey a wide range of emotions, from longing to mistrust, from puzzlement to sorrow." Critic Anthony Lane also noted Keaton's body language:

The traditional Buster stance requires that he remain upstanding, full of backbone, looking ahead... [in The General] he clambers onto the roof of his locomotive and leans gently forward to scan the terrain, with the breeze in his hair and adventure zipping toward him around the next bend. It is the angle that you remember: the figure perfectly straight but tilted forward, like the Spirit of Ecstasy on the hood of a Rolls-Royce... [in The Three Ages], he drives a low-grade automobile over a bump in the road, and the car just crumbles beneath him. Rerun it on video, and you can see Buster riding the collapse like a surfer, hanging onto the steering wheel, coming beautifully to rest as the wave of wreckage breaks.

Film historian Jeffrey Vance wrote:

Buster Keaton's comedy endures not just because he had a face that belongs on Mount Rushmore, at once hauntingly immovable and classically American, but because that face was attached to one of the most gifted actors and directors who ever graced the screen. Evolved from the knockabout upbringing of the vaudeville stage, Keaton's comedy is a whirlwind of hilarious, technically precise, adroitly executed, and surprising gags, very often set against a backdrop of visually stunning set pieces and locations—all this masked behind his unflinching, stoic veneer.

Pork-pie hats

Keaton designed and modified his own pork pie hats during his career. In 1964, he told an interviewer that in making "this particular pork pie", he "started with a good Stetson and cut it down", stiffening the brim with sugar water. The hats were often destroyed during Keaton's wild film antics; some were given away as gifts and some were snatched by souvenir hunters. Keaton said he was lucky if he used only six hats in making a film. He estimated that he and his wife Eleanor made thousands of hats during his career. Keaton observed that during his silent period, such a hat cost him around two dollars (~$27–33 in 2022 dollars); at the time of his interview, he said, they cost almost $13 (~$116 in 2022 dollars).

Personal life 

On May 31, 1921, Keaton married Natalie Talmadge, his leading lady in Our Hospitality, and the sister of actresses Norma Talmadge (married to his business partner Joseph M. Schenck at the time) and Constance Talmadge, at Norma's home in Bayside, Queens. They had two sons: Joseph, called James (June 2, 1922 – February 14, 2007), and Robert (February 3, 1924 – July 19, 2009).

After Robert's birth, the marriage began to suffer. Talmadge decided not to have any more children, banishing Keaton to a separate bedroom; he dated actresses Dorothy Sebastian and Kathleen Key during this period. Natalie's extravagance was another factor, spending up to a third of her husband's earnings.

It was clear that Mr. Keaton and Mrs. Keaton had different ideas and lifestyles. Keaton had designed and built a modest but comfortable, cottage-like home as a surprise wedding gift for his bride. When she saw the little house, she flew into a rage: she thought the house was much too small, with no place for servants. Realizing that his bride wanted a palace, he sold the cottage to MGM executive Eddie Mannix at cost, and commissioned Gene Verge Sr. in 1926 to build a  estate in Beverly Hills for $300,000, which was later owned by James Mason and Cary Grant. After attempts at reconciliation, she divorced him in 1932, and changed the boys' surname to "Talmadge". On July 1, 1942, the 18-year-old Robert and the 20-year-old Joseph made the name change permanent after their mother won a court petition.

With the failure of his marriage and the loss of his independence as a filmmaker, Keaton descended into alcoholism. He was briefly institutionalized, according to the Turner Classic Movies documentary So Funny It Hurt. He escaped a straitjacket with tricks learned from Harry Houdini. In 1933, he married his nurse Mae Scriven during an alcoholic binge about which he afterwards claimed to remember nothing. Scriven claimed that she didn't know Keaton's real first name until after the marriage. She filed for divorce in 1935 after finding him with Leah Clampitt Sewell, the wife of millionaire Barton Sewell, in a hotel in Santa Barbara. They divorced in 1936 at great financial cost to Keaton. After undergoing aversion therapy, he stopped drinking for five years.

 
On May 29, 1940, Keaton married Eleanor Norris, who was 23 years his junior. She has been credited with salvaging his life and career. The marriage lasted until his death. Between 1947 and 1954, the couple appeared regularly in the Cirque Medrano in Paris as a double act. She came to know his routines so well that she often participated in them in television revivals.

Death 
Keaton died of lung cancer on February 1, 1966, aged 70, in Woodland Hills, Los Angeles. Despite being diagnosed with cancer in January 1966, he was never told he was terminally ill. Keaton thought that he was recovering from a severe case of bronchitis. Confined to a hospital during his final days, Keaton was restless and paced the room endlessly, desiring to return home. In a British television documentary about his career, his widow Eleanor told producers from Thames Television that Keaton was up out of bed and moving around, and even played cards with friends who came to visit the day before he died. He was buried at Forest Lawn Memorial Park Cemetery in Hollywood Hills, California.

Influence and legacy 

Keaton was presented with a 1959 Academy Honorary Award at the 32nd Academy Awards, held in April 1960. Keaton has two stars on the Hollywood Walk of Fame: 6619 Hollywood Boulevard (for motion pictures); and 6225 Hollywood Boulevard (for television).

Six of his films have been included in the National Film Registry, making him one of the most honored filmmakers on that list: One Week (1920), Cops (1922), Sherlock Jr. (1924), The General (1926), Steamboat Bill, Jr., and The Cameraman (both 1928)

A 1957 film biography, The Buster Keaton Story, starring Donald O'Connor as Keaton was released. The screenplay, by Sidney Sheldon, who also directed the film, was loosely based on Keaton's life but contained many factual errors and merged his three wives into one character. A 1987 documentary, Buster Keaton: A Hard Act to Follow, directed by Kevin Brownlow and David Gill, won two Emmy Awards.

The International Buster Keaton Society was founded on October 4, 1992: Keaton's birthday. Dedicated to bringing greater public attention to Keaton's life and work, the membership includes many individuals from the television and film industry: actors, producers, authors, artists, graphic novelists, musicians, and designers, as well as those who simply admire the magic of Buster Keaton. The Society's nickname, the "Damfinos," draws its name from a boat in Keaton's 1921 comedy, The Boat.

In 1994, caricaturist Al Hirschfeld penned a series of silent film stars for the United States Post Office, including Rudolph Valentino and Keaton. Hirschfeld said that modern film stars were more difficult to depict, that silent film comedians such as Laurel and Hardy and Keaton "looked like their caricatures".

In his essay Film-arte, film-antiartístico, artist Salvador Dalí declared the works of Keaton to be prime examples of "anti-artistic" filmmaking, calling them "pure poetry". In 1925, Dalí produced a collage titled The Marriage of Buster Keaton featuring an image of the comedian in a seated pose, staring straight ahead with his trademark boater hat resting in his lap.

Film critic Roger Ebert stated, "The greatest of the silent clowns is Buster Keaton, not only because of what he did, but because of how he did it. Harold Lloyd made us laugh as much, Charlie Chaplin moved us more deeply, but no one had more courage than Buster."

In his presentation for The General, filmmaker Orson Welles hailed Buster Keaton as "the greatest of all the clowns in the history of the cinema... a supreme artist, and I think one of the most beautiful people who was ever photographed".

Filmmaker Mel Brooks has credited Keaton as a major influence, saying: "I owe (Buster) a lot on two levels: One for being such a great teacher for me as a filmmaker myself, and the other just as a human being watching this gifted person doing these amazing things. He made me believe in make-believe." He also admitted to borrowing the idea of the changing room scene in The Cameraman for his own film Silent Movie.

Keaton's Sherlock Jr., in which he walks into the movie he is projecting, was an influence Woody Allen's The Purple Rose of Cairo, in which a character walks out of a movie and into real life.

Actor and stunt performer Johnny Knoxville cites Keaton as an inspiration when coming up with ideas for Jackass projects. He re-enacted a famous Keaton stunt for the finale of Jackass Number Two.

Comedian Richard Lewis stated that Keaton was his prime inspiration, and spoke of having a close friendship with Keaton's widow Eleanor. Lewis was particularly moved by the fact that Eleanor said his eyes looked like Keaton's.

In 2012, Kino Lorber released The Ultimate Buster Keaton Collection, a 14-disc Blu-ray box set of Keaton's work, including 11 of his feature films.

In 2016, Tony Hale portrayed Keaton in an episode of Drunk History focusing on the silent comedian's supposed rivalry with Charlie Chaplin, who was played by musician Billie Joe Armstrong. 

On June 16, 2018, the International Buster Keaton Society laid a four-foot plaque in honor of both Keaton and Charles Chaplin on the corner of the shared block (1021 Lillian Ave) where each had made many of their silent comedies in Hollywood. In honor of the event, the City of Los Angeles declared the date "Buster Keaton Day."

In 2018 filmmaker Peter Bogdanovich released The Great Buster: A Celebration, a documentary about Keaton's life, career, and legacy.

In 2022, two works on Keaton appeared within a month of each other. Critic Dana Stevens published a cultural history of Keaton's life and work, Camera Man: Buster Keaton, the Dawn of Cinema, and the Invention of the Twentieth Century. It was followed a month later by James Curtis' biography Buster Keaton: A Filmmaker's Life.

In 2023, Keaton’s life and work was depicted in the graphic novel biography Buster: A Life in Pictures, written by Ryan Barnett and illustrated by Matthew Tavares.

Filmography

Directed features:
Three Ages (1923)
Our Hospitality (1923)
Sherlock Jr. (1924)
The Navigator (1924)
Seven Chances (1925)
Go West (1925)
Battling Butler (1926)
The General (1926)
College (1927)
Steamboat Bill, Jr. (1928)
The Cameraman (1928)
Spite Marriage (1929)

References

Further reading 
 Agee, James, "Comedy's Greatest Era" from Life (September 5, 1949), reprinted in Agee on Film (1958), McDowell, Obolensky (2000), Modern Library
 Anobile, Richard J. (ed.) (1976), The Best of Buster: Classic Comedy Scenes Direct from the Films of Buster Keaton. Crown Books.
 Benayoun, Robert, The Look of Buster Keaton (1983) St. Martin's Press
 Bengtson, John (1999), Silent Echoes: Discovering Early Hollywood Through the Films of Buster Keaton, Santa Monica Press.
 
 Brighton, Catherine (2008), Keep Your Eye on the Kid: The Early Years of Buster Keaton, Roaring Brook Press. An illustrated children's book about Keaton's career.
 Brownlow, Kevin, "Buster Keaton" from The Parade's Gone By. Alfred A. Knopf (1968), University of California Press (1976)
 Byron, Stuart and Weis, Elizabeth (eds.) (1977), The National Society of Film Critics on Movie Comedy, Grossman/Viking
 Carroll, Noel (2009), Comedy Incarnate: Buster Keaton, Physical Humor, and Bodily Coping, Wiley-Blackwell
 Dardis, Tom, Keaton: The Man Who Wouldn't Lie Down, Scribners (1979), Limelight Editions (2004)
 Robinson, David (1969), Buster Keaton, Indiana University Press, in association with British Film Institute
 Durgnat, Raymond (1970), "Self-Help with a Smile" from The Crazy Mirror: Hollywood Comedy and the American Image, Dell
 Edmonds, Andy (1992), Frame-Up!: The Shocking Scandal That Destroyed Hollywood's Biggest Comedy Star Roscoe "Fatty" Arbuckle, Avon Books
 Everson, William K. (1978), American Silent Film, Oxford University Press
 Gilliatt, Penelope (1973), "Buster Keaton" from Unholy Fools: Wits, Comics, Disturbers of the Peace, Viking
 Horton, Andrew (1997), Buster Keaton's Sherlock Jr. Cambridge University Press
 Keaton, Buster (with Charles Samuels) (1960), My Wonderful World of Slapstick, Doubleday
 Keaton, Buster (2007), Buster Keaton: Interviews (Conversations with Filmmakers Series), University Press of Mississippi
 Keaton, Eleanor, and Vance, Jeffrey (2001), Buster Keaton Remembered, Harry N. Abrams 
 Kerr, Walter (1975), The Silent Clowns, Alfred A. Knopf, (1990) Da Capo Press 
 Kline, Jim (1993), The Complete Films of Buster Keaton, Carol Pub. Group
 Knopf, Robert (1999), The Theater and Cinema of Buster Keaton, Princeton University Press 
 Lahue, Kalton C. (1966), World of Laughter: The Motion Picture Comedy Short, 1910–1930, University of Oklahoma Press
  (1967), Buster Keaton, A.S. Barnes
 Maltin, Leonard (1978), The Great Movie Comedians, Crown Books
 Maltin, Leonard (revised 1983), Selected Short Subjects (first published as The Great Movie Shorts, 1972, Crown Books), Da Capo Press
 Mast, Gerald (1973, 2nd ed. 1979), The Comic Mind: Comedy and the Movies, University of Chicago Press
 McCaffrey, Donald W. (1968), 4 Great Comedians: Chaplin, Lloyd, Keaton, Langdon A.S. Barnes
 McPherson, Edward (2005), Buster Keaton: Tempest in a Flat Hat Newmarket Press 
 Meade, Marion (1995), Buster Keaton: Cut to the Chase, HarperCollins
 Mitchell, Glenn (2003), A–Z of Silent Film Comedy, B.T. Batsford Ltd.
 Moews, Daniel (1977), Keaton: The Silent Features Close Up University of California Press
 Neibaur, James L. and Terri Niemi (2013), Buster Keaton's Silent Shorts, Scarecrow Press
 Neibaur, James L. (2010), The Fall of Buster Keaton: His Films for MGM, Educational Pictures, and Columbia, Scarecrow Press
 Neibaur, James L. (2006), Arbuckle and Keaton: Their 14 Film Collaborations, McFarland & Co.
 Oderman, Stuart (2005), Roscoe "Fatty" Arbuckle: A Biography of the Silent Film Comedian, McFarland & Co.
 Oldham, Gabriella (1996), Keaton's Silent Shorts: Beyond the Laughter, Southern Illinois University Press
 Rapf, Joanna E. and Green, Gary L. (1995), Buster Keaton: A Bio-Bibliography, Greenwood Press
 Robinson, David (1969), The Great Funnies: A History of Film Comedy. E.P. Dutton.
 Scott, Oliver Lindsey (1995), Buster Keaton: The Little Iron Man. Buster Books.
 Smith, Imogen Sara (2008), Buster Keaton: The Persistence of Comedy. Gambit Publishing. .
 Staveacre, Tony (1987), Slapstick!: The Illustrated Story. Angus & Robertson Publishers.
 Yallop, David (1976), The Day the Laughter Stopped: The True Story of Fatty Arbuckle. St. Martin's Press.

External links 

 
 
 
 The International Buster Keaton Society
 Buster Keaton Museum
 Buster Keaton and the Muskegon Connection
 Buster Keaton in Five Easy Clips
 Buster Keaton Photo Galleries (includes rare images of BK smiling and laughing)
 Buster Keaton as a child performer (Univ. of Washington/Sayre collection)
 Buster Keaton's Silent Shorts (1920–1923) by James L. Neibaur and Terri Niemi

 
1895 births
1966 deaths
19th-century American male actors
20th-century American comedians
20th-century American male actors
Academy Honorary Award recipients
American male child actors
American male comedians
American male comedy actors
American male film actors
American male silent film actors
American male stage actors
American male television actors
United States Army personnel of World War I
American mimes
American parodists
American stunt performers
American surrealist artists
American ukulele players
Articles containing video clips
Burials at Forest Lawn Memorial Park (Hollywood Hills)
Comedy film directors
Deaths from lung cancer in California
Film directors from California
Male actors from Beverly Hills, California
Male actors from Kansas
Metro-Goldwyn-Mayer contract players
Military personnel from Kansas
Parody film directors
People from Woodson County, Kansas
Silent film comedians
Silent film directors
Slapstick comedians
Surreal comedy
United States Army soldiers
Vaudeville performers
Film directors from Kansas
Columbia Pictures contract players
19th-century American comedians